Kogi (Cogui), or Kagaba (Cágaba), is a Chibchan language of Colombia. The Kogi people are almost entirely monolingual, and maintain the only unconquered Andean civilization.

Phonology 

 /e, ẽ/ can also be heard as [ɛ, ɛ̃] when in unstressed syllables.

 Affricate sounds [ts, dz, tʃ, dʒ] are heard when sibilant sounds /s, z, ʃ, ʒ/ precede /n/. If /t, d/ precede /i/ then they are realized as affricates [tʃ, dʒ].
 /n/ before /i/ may be realized as a palatal [ɲ].

References

Languages of Colombia
Chibchan languages